Montague George "Monty" Westmore (June 12, 1923 – November 13, 2007) was part of the third generation of the Westmore family of American make-up artists in film and television who worked on over 75 films and television series since 1950. He was the brother of make-up artist Michael Westmore and uncle of actress McKenzie Westmore.

Westmore spent seven seasons as make-up artist on The Adventures of Ozzie and Harriet.  He was screen legend Joan Crawford's personal make-up artist on the films What Ever Happened to Baby Jane? and Strait-Jacket and was a beneficiary of Crawford's will after her death in 1977.  Westmore later served as Paul Newman's personal make-up artist on seventeen of the actor's films over the course of nearly three decades. 
 
Westmore shared the 1991 Best Makeup Academy Award nomination for his work as assistant makeup supervisor on Steven Spielberg's Hook. He also received an Emmy Award nomination for the 1983 ABC drama Who Will Love My Children? starring Ann-Margret, and again in the 1996 HBO movie The Late Shift.

Westmore died in Woodland Hills, California in 2007 of prostate cancer.

Partial filmography
 The Adventures of Ozzie and Harriet - 1958-66
 What Ever Happened to Baby Jane? - 1962
 The Towering Inferno - 1974
 3 Women - 1977
 The Verdict - 1982
 Airplane II: The Sequel - 1982
 Who Will Love My Children? - 1983
 National Lampoon's European Vacation - 1985
 Stand by Me - 1986
 The Color of Money - 1986
 Alien Nation - 1988
 Fat Man and Little Boy - 1989
 Hook - 1991 (Academy Award nominee for Best Makeup)
 Chaplin - 1992
 Jurassic Park - 1993
 The Hudsucker Proxy - 1994
 The Shawshank Redemption - 1994
 Nobody's Fool - 1994
 Outbreak - 1995
 Se7en - 1995
 The Late Shift - 1996 (Emmy Award nominee for Outstanding Individual Achievement in Makeup for a Miniseries or a Special)
 Star Trek: First Contact - 1996
 Star Trek: Insurrection - 1998
 How the Grinch Stole Christmas - 2000

See also
 Westmore family

References

External links
 

1923 births
2007 deaths
American make-up artists
Monty